Operation Mosaic was a series of two British nuclear tests conducted in the Monte Bello Islands in Western Australia on 16 May and 19 June 1956. These tests followed the Operation Totem series and preceded the Operation Buffalo series. The second test in the series was the largest ever conducted in Australia.

The purpose of the tests was to explore increasing the yield of British nuclear weapons through boosting with lithium-6 and deuterium, and the use of a natural uranium tamper. Although a boosted fission weapon is not a hydrogen bomb, which the British Government had agreed would not be tested in Australia, the tests were connected with the British hydrogen bomb programme.

The Operation Totem tests of 1953 had been carried out at Emu Field in South Australia, but Emu Field was considered unsuitable for Operation Mosaic. A new, permanent test site was being prepared at Maralinga in South Australia, but would not be ready until September 1956. It was decided that the best option was to return to the Monte Bello Islands, where Operation Hurricane had been conducted in 1952. To allow the task force flagship, the tank landing ship , to return to the UK and refit in time for Operation Grapple, the planned first test of a British hydrogen bomb, 15 July was set as the terminal date for Operation Mosaic. The British Government was anxious that Grapple should take place before a proposed moratorium on nuclear testing came into effect. The second test was therefore conducted under time pressure.

Background
During the early part of the Second World War, Britain had a nuclear weapons project, code-named Tube Alloys, which the 1943 Quebec Agreement merged with the American Manhattan Project to create a combined American, British, and Canadian project. The British Government expected that the United States would continue to share nuclear technology after the war, which it regarded as a joint discovery, but the United States Atomic Energy Act of 1946 (McMahon Act) ended technical cooperation. Fearing a resurgence of United States isolationism, and Britain losing its great power status, the British Government restarted its own development effort, which was given the cover name "High Explosive Research". The first British atomic bomb was tested in Operation Hurricane at the Monte Bello Islands in Western Australia on 3 October 1952.

Britain thereby became the third nuclear power after the United States and the Soviet Union, but just four weeks after Operation Hurricane, the United States successfully demonstrated a hydrogen bomb. The technology mastered in Operation Hurricane was six years old, and with the hydrogen bomb in hand, the US Congress saw no benefit in renewing cooperation with the UK. All the while Britain strove for independence, at the same time it sought interdependence in the form of a renewal of the Special Relationship with the United States. The British Government therefore resolved on 27 July 1954 to initiate the British hydrogen bomb programme. At the time, momentum was gathering both domestically and internationally for a moratorium on nuclear testing. The British Government was most anxious that this should not occur before Britain had developed hydrogen bombs, which it was hoped would be achieved in 1957.

Purpose and site selection
In thinking about thermonuclear designs, the British scientists at the Atomic Weapons Research Establishment at Aldermaston considered boosted fission weapons. These are a type of nuclear device in which isotopes of light elements such as lithium-6 and deuterium are added. The resulting nuclear fusion reactions produce neutrons, and thus increase the rate of fission, and therefore the yield. The British had no practical experience with boosting, so a test of the concept was required. The scientists had also heard a rumour from American sources that the yield could be improved by up to 50 per cent through the use of a natural uranium tamper. Two tests were therefore scheduled: one with a lead tamper to investigate the effect of lithium deuteride, and one with a natural uranium one to investigate effect of the tamper. It was hoped that the two tests would advance progress towards building a British hydrogen bomb.

The need for speed dictated the location. The Operation Totem tests of 1953 had been carried out at Emu Field in South Australia, but it was considered unsuitable. Emu Field therefore relied on air transport, but dust storms were a problem. Moreover, a shortage of water severely limited the number of personnel at the site. A new, permanent test site was therefore being prepared at Maralinga in South Australia, but it would not be ready until September 1956, and the Operation Buffalo tests were already scheduled to be held there. It was therefore decided that the best option was to return to the Monte Bello Islands, where the operation could be supported by the Royal Navy. There were also doubts as to whether the Australian Government would allow a  test at Maralinga.

This was a sensitive matter; there was an agreement with Australia that no thermonuclear testing would be carried out there. The Australian Minister for Supply, Howard Beale, responding to rumours reported in the newspapers, asserted that "the Federal Government has no intention of allowing any hydrogen bomb tests to take place in Australia. Nor has it any intention of allowing any experiments connected with hydrogen bomb tests to take place here." While a boosted fusion weapon is not a hydrogen bomb, the tests were indeed connected with hydrogen bomb development.

The Prime Minister of the United Kingdom, Sir Anthony Eden, cabled the Prime Minister of Australia, Robert Menzies, on 16 May 1955. Eden detailed the nature and purpose of the tests. He explained that the experiments would include the addition of light elements as a boost, but promised that the yield of neither test would exceed two and a half times that of the Operation Hurricane test. Later an  limit was agreed to. Eden informed Menzies that the two shots would be from towers, which would produce a fifth of the fallout of that of Operation Hurricane, and there would be no danger to people or animals on the mainland. He explained that the use of the Monte Bello Islands would save as much as six months' of development time. Menzies cabled his approval of the tests on 20 June.

Preparations
Like Operation Hurricane before it, the test was a Royal Navy responsibility. Planning commenced in February 1955 under the codename Operation Giraffe. In June 1955, the Admiralty adopted the codename Operation Mosaic. The Atomic Trials Executive in London, chaired by Lieutenant General Sir Frederick Morgan, had already begun planning Operation Buffalo. It assumed responsibility for Operation Mosaic as well, sitting as the Mosaic Executive (Mosex) or Buffalo Executive (Buffalex) as appropriate. Captain Hugh Martell would be in charge as commander Task Force 308, with the temporary rank of commodore. Charles Adams from Aldermaston, who had been the deputy technical director to Leonard Tyte for Operation Hurricane and to William Penney on Operation Totem, was appointed the scientific director for Operation Mosaic, with Ieuan Maddock as the scientific superintendent. Group Captain S. W. B. (Paddy) Menaul would command the Air Task Group. Menaul was also a nuclear test veteran, having been an observer on board Vickers Valiant WZ366 when it had made the first operational drop of a British atomic bomb during Operation Totem. Planning was conducted at Aldermaston.

On 18 July 1955 a five-man mission headed by Martell that included Adams, Menaul and Lieutenant Commanders A. K. Dodds and R. R. Fotheringham departed the UK for Australia. They arrived on 22 July, and began a series of discussions. The Australian Government created a Monte Bello Working Party as a subcommittee of the Maralinga Committee as a counterpart to the British Mosex. Adams met with W. A. S. Butement of the recently formed Atomic Weapons Tests Safety Committee (AWTSC), an organisation created by the Australian Government to oversee the safety of nuclear tests. Mosex agreed that at least two members of the AWTSC would be present on board the Task Force 308 flagship, the Landing Ship, Tank, when the decision to fire was taken. He also had discussions with Leonard Dwyer, the Director of the Australian Bureau of Meteorology about the weather conditions that could be expected for the test. It was agreed that a Royal Australian Navy (RAN) frigate would act as a weather ship for the test series, and that a second weather ship might be required to give warnings of willy willys and cyclones.

A small fleet of ships was assembled for Operation Mosaic. HMS Narvik began a refit at HM Dockyard, Chatham, in July 1955, which was completed by November. She departed the UK on 29 December 1955, and travelled via the Suez Canal, reaching Fremantle on 23 February 1956. The frigate , normally the yacht of the Commander-in-Chief, Far East Fleet, was loaned to act as an accommodation ship for scientists and VIPs. Along with the tanker , they formed Task Group 308.1. These formed Task Group 308.3, which was mainly responsible for weather reporting. The destroyer  was detailed to carry out scientific tests, and formed Task Group 308.4.

They were augmented by RAN vessels, designated Task Group 308.2. The sloop  and boom defence vessel  carried out a hydrographic survey of the Monte Bello Islands, laying marker buoys for moorings. Care had to be taken with this, as Operation Hurricane had left some parts of the islands dangerously radioactive. The corvettes  and  provided logistical support, ferried personnel between the islands and the mainland, and accommodated 14 Australian and British media representatives during the first test. They were replaced by Karangi for the second test. A pair of RAN  motor lighters, MWL251 and MRL252, provided water and refrigeration respectively. The two barges were visited by the First Sea Lord, Admiral Lord Mountbatten, and Lady Mountbatten, who flew out to the islands on a Whirlwind helicopter on 15 April.

Only a small party of Royal Engineers and two Aldermaston scientists travelled on Narvik. The main scientific party left London by air on 1 April. The Air Task Group consisted of 107 officers and 407 other ranks. Most were based at Pearce near Perth and Onslow in the Pilbara region, although four Royal Air Force (RAF) Shackletons and about 70 RAF personnel were based at RAAF Base Darwin, from whence the Shackletons daily flew weather reconnaissance flights, commencing on 2 March. There was a cyclone three days later. Three Royal Australian Air Force (RAAF) Neptunes flew safety patrols, five RAF Varsity aircraft tracked clouds and flew on low-level radiological survey missions, five RAF Canberra bombers were tasked with collecting radioactive samples, four RAF Hastings aircraft flew between the UK and Australia, and two Whirlwind helicopters provided a taxi service. The United States Air Force (USAF)  provided a pair of C-118 Liftmasters to collect radioactive samples. Lieutenant-Colonel R. N. B. Holmes was in charge of the Royal Engineers, whose task including erecting the  aluminium towers for the shots.

G1

Adams arrived at Monte Bello on 22 April, and was sufficiently impressed with the progress of works to schedule a scientific rehearsal for 27 April. A second scientific rehearsal was held on 2 May, followed by a full dress rehearsal on 5 May. The fissile material was delivered by an RAF Hastings to Onslow, from whence it was collected by HMS Alert on 11 May, and delivered to the Monte Bello Islands the following day. Five members of the AWTSC—Leslie H. Martin, Ernest Titterton, Cecil Eddy, Butement and Dwyer—arrived at Onslow and were flown to Narvik by helicopter on 14 May. The following day, Martell set 16 May as the date for the test. There had been protests in Perth at the test series, and the Deputy Premier of Western Australia, John Tonkin, promised to discuss demands for an end to the tests. Martin and Titterton confronted Martell and Adams, and Martin told them that without sufficient information about the nature of the tests, the AWTSC could not approve the test. That it had a veto came as a surprise; it was not what their orders from London said. Penney sent a message to Adams 10 May: 

Rather than stonewall, Adams and Martell disclosed the same information that had been given to Menzies, on condition that they kept it to themselves. This mollified them, and the G1 test went ahead. The device was detonated on Trimouille Island at 03:50 UTC (11:50 local time) on 16 May. Soon afterwards, Narvik and Alert entered the Parting Pool in the Monte Bello Islands. The Radiological Group, wearing full protective clothing, entered the lagoon in a cutter. They retrieved measuring instruments and conducted a ground survey. A tent with a decontamination area was established ashore, and a water pump allowed the Radiological Group to wash themselves before they returned to Narvik. The main danger to the ships' crews was considered to be from radioactive seaweed, so they were prohibited from catching or eating fish, and the ships' evaporators were not run. Spot checks were made to verify that there was no contamination on board. Most of the sample collection was completed by 20 May. An extra run was made to collect film badges from Hermite Island, and Maddock paid the crater a visit on 25 May to collect further samples. Two RAF Canberra bombers flew through the cloud to collect samples, one of which was flown by Menaul.

The results of the test were mixed. Valuable data was obtained. The implosion system had performed flawlessly, but the boosting effect of the lithium deuteride had been negligible; the process had not been fully understood. The fallout cloud initially moved out to sea as predicted, but then reversed direction and drifted across northern Australia. Tests on the aircraft at Onslow had detected signs of radioactive contamination from G1, indicating that some fallout had been blown over the mainland.

G2

The results of G1 meant that a natural uranium tamper could be used in G2 without exceeding the planned  limit agreed to with the AWTSC. Scientific rehearsals for G2 were held on 28 and 31 May, followed by a full rehearsal on 4 June. The fissile core for the device was delivered to Onslow by RAF Hastings on 6 June, and once again was couriered to the  Monte Bello Islands by HMS Alert. Then followed a period of waiting for suitable weather conditions. The idea was to avoid, as far as possible, fallout being blown over the mainland. At this time of year winds at low altitudes were mainly subject to coastal influences, but above  the prevailing winds were from the west. What was required was an interval during which the prevailing wind pattern was interrupted.

These were not common at this time of the year; at the start of Operation Mosaic, it had been estimated that conditions favourable for G2 would occur only three days per month. In fact, since Narvik had arrived in March, not a single day had been suitable. And good weather conditions alone were insufficient; the meteorologists had to accurately forecast them. To allow Narvik to return to the UK and refit for Operation Grapple, the first test of a British hydrogen bomb, 15 July was set as the terminal date for Mosaic. As the deadline approached, William Cook, the scientist in charge of the hydrogen bomb project at Aldermaston, determined that in view of the results of G1, G2 was now more important than ever. He agreed that, if necessary, Grapple, could be delayed to conduct G2. With time running short, the test procedures were altered to allow for a break in the weather to be exploited, with an earlier firing time and a shorter countdown.

Another complication was safety. While the test of a larger device would normally mandate a larger safety area, Beale announced that G2 was going to be smaller than G1. To avoid embarrassing him, the safety area was not enlarged, and no official announcement was made to the contrary. The weather improved on 8 June, and Martell ordered the countdown to begin the following day, but Beale objected to a test being carried out on a Sunday. During Operation Totem there was an agreement that no tests would be conducted on Sundays. Mosex considered that matter in London, and directed Martell not to test on 10 June. The following 48 hours were unsuitable. On 17 June the meteorologists predicted a break in the weather and Martell ordered the countdown to recommence.

G2 was detonated from a tower on Alpha Island at 02:14 UTC (10:14 local time) on 19 June. She based this claim on "secret documents released to the Public Record Office in 1985", but the text was uncited, and the documents have never been found. British official historian Lorna Arnold reported that she had never seen any such documents.

The procedure for collecting samples was far more limited than that of G1. A Land Rover was landed from a Landing Craft Assault (LCA) and driven by a party wearing protective clothing  to within  of ground zero to collect samples and recover the blast measurement equipment. Another sortie was made to collect film badges from Hermite Island, and Maddock collected a sample from the G2 crater. The following day, the Canberra sent to track the cloud and collect more samples could not locate it at all. The bulk of the fallout drifted over the Arafura Sea, but owing to different winds at different altitudes, part of it again drifted over the mainland.

As fallout was detected over northern Australia by monitoring stations, in combination with Beale's announcement that G2 would be smaller than G1, an impression was generated that something had gone horribly wrong. The acting Prime Minister, Sir Arthur Fadden, ordered an inquiry. Seamen in Fremantle demanded that the SS Koolinda, a cattle transport on which 75 cattle had died on board, be inspected, as it was feared that they had died from radioactive poisoning. The seamen refused to unload the remaining 479 cattle. A physicist from the Commonwealth X-Ray and Radium Laboratory (CXRL) with a Geiger counter found no evidence of radioactive contamination, and the deaths were determined to have resulted from red water disease caused by a malaria-like parasite.

Aftermath
By the 1980s the radioactivity had decayed to the point where it was no longer hazardous to the casual visitor, but there were still radioactive metal fragments. The island remained a prohibited area until 1992. A 2006 zoological survey found that the wildlife had recovered. As part of the Gorgon gas project, rats and feral cats were eradicated from the Monte Bello Islands in 2009, and birds and marsupials were transplanted from nearby Barrow Island to Hermite Island. Today, the Monte Bello Islands are a park. Visitors are advised not to spend more than an hour per day at the test sites, or to take relics of the tests as souvenirs. A pyramid-shaped obelisk marks the site of the G2 explosion on Alpha Island.

Summary

Notes

References

 
 
 
 
 
 
 
 
 
 
 
 
 
 
 
 
 
 
 

Mosaic
20th-century military history of the United Kingdom
1950s in Western Australia
Montebello Islands archipelago
1956 in Australia